Great Green Valley (translit. Didi mtsvane veli) is a 1967 Georgian art-drama film directed by Merab Kokochashvili, written by Merab Eliozishvili.

Cast
Dodo Abashidze as Sosana
Lia Kapanadze as Pirimze
Mzia Maglakelidze as Sopio
Ilia Bakakuri a sGiorgi 
Z. Tseradze as Iotami
Guram Gegeshidze as Geologist
Grigol Tkabladze as Farm manager

References

External links

1967 drama films
Georgian-language films
1960s avant-garde and experimental films
Drama films from Georgia (country)